Kombo Itindi is a commune and arrondissement in the Ndian département, Southwest Province, western Cameroon. A costal town on the Atlantic Ocean, it is a fishing community.

References
Ministry of Territorial Administration and Decentralization - Southwest province

Communes of Southwest Region (Cameroon)

Populated places in Southwest Region (Cameroon)